Kavaloi, is a group of three uninhabited Greek islets, close to the coast of Lasithi, eastern Crete. The close group comprises the islets Anavatis (Αναβάτης "rider"), Kavallos (Καβάλλος), and Kefali (Κεφαλή "head"). Administratively the islets are part of the municipal unit Lefki.

See also
List of islands of Greece

Landforms of Lasithi
Uninhabited islands of Crete
Islands of Greece